The Catholic University of Petrópolis (UCP) is a private and non-profit university in Petrópolis — the capital of the State of Rio de Janeiro for nine years and the largest city of the highlands of the state. It is maintained by the Catholic Archdiocese of Petrópolis. The university had the highest score in the state of Rio de Janeiro in the National Student Performance Exam assessment for the Bachelor's degree in Physiotherapy (undergraduate) and the third highest score in the Bachelor's degree in Biomedicine (undergraduate). With that result, UCP is the best evaluated private university in the state in the respective courses. UCP Law School is one of the only ones recommended by the National Bar Association of Brazil in the region.

Unities and courses

Undergraduate Degree

Admission
For undergraduate admission to UCP two exams are used: ENEM and its own vestibular test.

References

External links
 Official website

Educational institutions established in 1961
Universities and colleges in Rio de Janeiro (state)
Catholic universities and colleges in Brazil
1961 establishments in Brazil